Zvi Heifetz (born December 9, 1956) is an Israeli diplomat who currently serves as the Israeli Ambassador to China. He has previously served as the ambassador to the United Kingdom (from 2004 to 2007), the ambassador to Austria (from 2013 to 2015), and the ambassador to Russia (from 2015 to 2017).

Born in Tomsk, Russian SFSR, Heifetz moved to Israel at the age of 14. He spent 7 years with Israel Intelligence and completed as a major in the Israeli Army. He has a Law degree from the Tel Aviv University and is a member of the Israeli Bar.

Heifetz became the vice-chairman of the Maariv Group in 1999 and chairman of both the Hed-Arzi Music Production Company and Tower Records, Israel in 2001.

In 1989 Heiftetz served as one of the first Israeli diplomats at the Netherlands Embassy in Moscow, and in 1997 he worked as an external legal adviser to the Prime Minister's Office ("Nativ") on matters relating to the former Soviet Union. Since 2003 Heifetz has acted as an adviser and spokesman for the Ministry of Defence dealing with the Russian-language media.

References

External links 

Interview with Zvi Heifetz (2005)

1956 births
Living people
People from Tomsk
Russian Jews
Ambassadors of Israel to Russia
Soviet emigrants to Israel
Ambassadors of Israel to the United Kingdom
Tel Aviv University alumni
Ambassadors of Israel to Austria
Ambassadors of Israel to China